Christmas Island International Airport  is an airport located on Christmas Island, a territory of Australia in the Indian Ocean.

Located in an Australian territory, the airport is classified as a Category 2 international airport for all arrivals, including those from Australia. It is owned by the Commonwealth through the Department of Infrastructure and Regional Development and is operated under contract by Toll Remote Logistics.

History

From the late 1940s, when the island was still a British colony administered by Singapore and the Straits Settlements Administration, it was serviced occasionally by Royal Air Force (RAF) Short Sunderland flying boats before the construction of the airport.

Tampa crisis
A brief revival of the "old days" happened in 2001 during the Tampa crisis when the heightened Royal Australian Air Force (RAAF) traffic was complemented by a large number of Department of Immigration and Citizenship (DIAC) and media charters. During this incident, traffic at the airport is said to have been "near-continuous".

Satellite launch facility
After the closure of the casino, the resort was taken over by the Asia Pacific Space Centre, which developed plans for a satellite launch facility on Christmas Island. The company, with solid financial participation from the Australian Government, had planned to start satellite launches in 2004. Technical staff was to include 350-400 Russian rocket scientists and engineers, and componentry was to be flown in on Antonov An-124 and Boeing 747 freighters. To achieve this, the airport would need major extensions, and the Government allocated around A$55m to the task. This included a  runway extension, plus additional taxiways, apron space, and other infrastructure.

Facilities

Runway

Terminal
As the Indian Ocean Territories Islands are duty-free, the airport terminal has a Duty-free shop and licensed kiosk.  In 2018 the airport operator, Toll Remote Logistics, introduced complimentary public Wi-Fi.  This was the first time Wi-Fi had been offered for free at the airport on an island that only has a 2G mobile network.

Airlines and destinations

Traffic to and from the airport varies greatly. Along with regular flights to the Australian mainland, the airport receives weekly open charter flights from Jakarta with Garuda Indonesia and fortnightly open charter flights from Kuala Lumpur with Batik Air Malaysia.  Historically airlines such as Indonesia AirAsia, Malaysia Airlines and SilkAir travelled to the island. Tourist attractions such as the migration of the Christmas Island red crab and the island's Christmas Island Resort have caused spikes in traffic levels. The construction of an immigration detention centre on the island resulted in a temporary increase in RAAF and DIMIA arrivals.

Statistics 
Christmas Island International Airport served 26,723 revenue passengers during financial year 2017–2018.

Fees and Charges 
Fees and charges at the airport are set by the Commonwealth of Australia and are considerably higher than other airports, especially for small aircraft. The high cost per movement for aircraft less than 20,000kg of AUD $300 effectively ensures that scenic flights and smaller aircraft use is discouraged.

See also
 List of airports in territories of Australia
 Aviation transport in Australia

References

Notes

Further reading

External links 

 
 Christmas Island Airport case study

Airports in Christmas Island
International airports in Australia